Plutonium is a radioactive chemical element with symbol Pu and atomic number 94.

Plutonium may also refer to:

a ploutonion (Latin: plutonium), any of several places where the Greco-Roman god Pluto was worshipped, particularly
Pluto's Gate, the plutonium near the hot springs at Pamukkale in Turkey (ancient Phrygian Hierapolis)
Plutonium, a genus of centipedes
Plutonium, a fictional drug depicted in Clark Ashton Smith's "The Plutonium Drug"
 Plutonium Nyborg, a fictional drug in the film Heavy Metal

See also

 Pu (disambiguation)
 Pluto (disambiguation)
 Isotopes of plutonium